Paul Stewart Moyer (born July 26, 1961 in Villa Park, California) is a former professional American football safety who played seven seasons for the Seattle Seahawks, from 1983 to 1989. He coached the Seahawks' secondary from 1990 to 1994. He currently appears as an analyst and occasional host on the Seahawks pregame and postgame shows.

Playing career
As an undrafted rookie out of Arizona State, Moyer played in all sixteen games with one start in 1983. The only interception return for a touchdown of his career occurred in week 3, from 19 yards out at the Kingdome in a  victory over the San Diego Chargers. Late in the fourth quarter of Seattle's 1986 game at New England in Sullivan Stadium, Moyer recovered a blocked punt in the end zone for a touchdown to tie the game at 31; the Seahawks' offense found the end zone a minute later for a  

In 1988, Moyer started all sixteen games and led the team with six interceptions. A neck injury ended his career in November 1989, and he served as an assistant coach for the next five years.

Moyer played in 98 NFL games with thirty starts, with career totals of eleven interceptions, eight fumble recoveries, and four sacks.

References

External links

1961 births
Living people
People from Villa Park, California
American football safeties
Seattle Seahawks players
Sportspeople from Orange County, California
Cal State Fullerton Titans football players
Arizona State Sun Devils football players
Seattle Seahawks coaches
Players of American football from California